This is a list of people educated at Bedford School.

Academia
Revd James Dennis (1815–1861), paleontologist and natural historian
Sir Warington Wilkinson Smyth FRS (1817–1890), geologist
Francis Penrose FRIBA FRS (1817–1903), Fellow of Magdalene College, Cambridge, architect, archaeologist and astronomer
Professor Charles Piazzi Smyth FRSE FRS FRAS FRSSA (1819–1900), Professor of Astronomy, University of Edinburgh, and Astronomer Royal for Scotland, 1846–1888
John Thompson Platts (1830–1904), Indian and Persian language scholar
Richard Daintree CMG (1832–1878), geologist who gave his name to the Daintree National Park, the Daintree Rainforest and the Daintree River, Australia
Thomas Gwyn Elger FRAS (1836–1897), selenographer who gave his name to the lunar crater Elger
Dr Arthur Coke Burnell (1840–1882), Sanskrit scholar
Dr Charles Heycock FRS (1858–1931), Fellow of King's College, Cambridge, chemist, winner of the Royal Society's Davy Medal, 1920
Dr Walter Gardiner FLS FRS (1859–1941), Fellow of Clare College, Cambridge, botanist, winner of the Royal Society's Royal Medal, 1898
Professor Sir Wyndham Dunstan KCMG FRS FCS (1861–1949), chemist and Director of the Imperial Institute, 1903–1924
Professor Sir Walter Langdon-Brown (1870–1946), Regius Professor of Physic, University of Cambridge, 1932–1935
Dr Thomas Cecil Fitzpatrick (1881–1931), President of Queens' College, Cambridge, 1906–1931, and Vice-Chancellor of the University of Cambridge, 1915–1917 and 1928–1929
Dr Charles Meek FRAI FRGS (1885–1965), Fellow of Brasenose College, Oxford, anthropologist
Revd Canon Thomas Wentworth Pym DSO (1885–1945), Fellow in Theology, Balliol College, Oxford
Dr Laurence Beddome Turner (1886–1963), Fellow of King's College, Cambridge, and Reader in Engineering, University of Cambridge
Professor William Rowan FRSC (1891–1957), Canadian biologist
Sir Karl Parker CBE FBA (1895–1992), art historian and Keeper of the Ashmolean Museum, 1945–1962
Professor John Desmond Bernal FRS (1901–1971), pioneer of X-ray crystallography in molecular biology
Professor Herbert Squire FRS (1909–1961), Zaharoff Professor of Aviation, Imperial College London, 1952–1961
Dr Archer John Porter Martin FRS (1910–2002), winner of the Nobel Prize in Chemistry, 1952
Professor Richard D'Aeth (1912–2008), educationalist and President of Hughes Hall, Cambridge, 1978–1984
Professor John Selwyn Bromley (1913–1985), Fellow in Modern History, Keble College, Oxford, 1947–1960, and Professor of Modern History, University of Southampton, 1960–1977
Professor Harry Cranbrook Allen MC FRHS (1917–1998), Fellow and Tutor in Modern History, Lincoln College, Oxford, 1946–1955, and Commonwealth Fund Professor of American History, University College London, 1955–1971
Professor Peter Corbett (1920–1992), Yates Professor of Classical Art and Archaeology, University College London, 1961–1982
Professor Paul Talalay (born 1923), John Jacob Abel Professor of Pharmacology and Director of the Laboratory for Molecular Sciences, Johns Hopkins School of Medicine, 1974–
Professor Roger Sargent FIChemE FIMA FREng (born 1926), Courtaulds Professor of Chemical engineering, Imperial College London, 1966–1992
Professor Frank Adams FRS (1930–1989), Fielden Professor of Mathematics, University of Manchester, 1964–1970, and Lowndean Professor of Astronomy and Geometry, University of Cambridge, 1970–1989
Professor Robert Cassen OBE (born 1935), Professor of the Economics of Development, University of Oxford, 1986–1997
Professor Quentin Skinner FRHS FBA (born 1940), Fellow in History, Christ's College, Cambridge, 1962–1996, and Regius Professor of Modern History, University of Cambridge, 1996–2008
Professor Richard Hills FRAS FRS (born 1945), Professor of Radio Astronomy, University of Cambridge, 1990–2007
Professor Andrew O'Shaughnessy FRHS (born 1959), Saunders Director, International Centre for Jefferson Studies, Monticello, and Professor of History, University of Virginia
Professor C.E.M. Hansel (1917–2011), Emeritus Professor of Experimental Psychology, Swansea University.

Actors, directors and entertainers

Cyril Harcourt (1872–1924), actor and playwright
H B Warner (1875–1958), actor nominated for the Academy Award for Best Supporting Actor, 1937
H F Maltby (1880–1963), actor, playwright and screenwriter
Roy Limbert (1893–1954), theatre director and producer
Torin Thatcher (1905–1981), actor
Bob Kellett (1927–2012), film director, producer and screenwriter
John Wood CBE (1930–2011), actor noted for his performances in Shakespeare and for his long association with Tom Stoppard
Andrew McCulloch (born 1945), actor and writer
Michael Radford (born 1946), film director and screenwriter, noted for films including Nineteen Eighty-Four, White Mischief and Il Postino
Simon Chandler (born 1953), actor
Richard Hopkins (1964–2012), television producer
Bob Barrett (born 1966), actor
Al Murray (born 1968), comedian
Joel Beckett (born 1973), actor
David Lloyd Vitty (born 1974), BBC Radio 1 presenter

Adventurers and nonconformists
Revd Stainton Moses (1839–1892), spiritualist
Colonel Frederick Burnaby (1842–1885), adventurer, army officer, author, balloonist, and correspondent for The Times
Samuel Liddell MacGregor Mathers (1854–1918), occultist
Ardern Hulme Beaman (1857–1929), adventurer, author, diplomat, and war correspondent
Lieutenant Colonel Stewart Blacker OBE (1887–1964), adventurer, army officer, author of First over Everest, and weapons designer
John de Vars Hazard MC (1888–1968), mountaineer who took part in the 1924 British Mount Everest expedition, famous for the disappearance of Mallory and Irvine
Reginald Teague-Jones MBE (1890–1988), intelligence officer active in the Caucasus and Central Asia during the Russian Civil War
Norman Baillie-Stewart (1909–1966), traitor known as 'The Officer in the Tower'
Simon Murray CBE (born 1940), adventurer, author, French Foreign Legionnaire, and the oldest man to reach the South Pole unsupported
Richard Foxen (born 1956), entrepreneur, businessman, philosopher and horticulturist
Rupert T Dover (born 1967), Assistant Commissioner of the Hong Kong Police Force

Architecture

John Pollard Seddon FRIBA (1827–1906), architect
Harry Bulkeley Creswell FRIBA (1869–1960), architect and author
Oswald Milne FRSA FRIBA (1881–1968), architect
Peter "Joe" Chamberlin CBE FRIBA (1919–1978), architect and town planner responsible for the Barbican Centre and the Barbican Estate in London
Sir Bernard Feilden CBE FRIBA (1919–2008), conservation architect whose work encompassed cathedrals, the Great Wall of China and the Taj Mahal

The Armed Forces

Victoria Cross and George Cross

First World War
Lieutenant Colonel George Campbell Wheeler VC (1880–1938)
Sub-Lieutenant Arthur Walderne St. Clair Tisdall VC (1890–1915)
Major Montague Shadworth Moore VC (1896–1966)
Second World War
Commander Richard Jolly GC (1896–1939)
Major General Henry Bowreman Foote VC CB DSO (1904–1993), General Officer Commanding, 11th Armoured Division, 1950–1953

Navy

Rear Admiral Alfred Ransom CBE (1871–1953), served during the Gambia Expedition, 1894, the Boxer Rebellion, 1900–1901, and the First World War
Vice Admiral Fawcet Wray DSO (1873–1932), commanded HMS Talbot at Gallipoli, 1915
Vice Admiral Arthur Kemmis Betty DSO (1877–1961), Aide-de-camp to King George V, Commander First Destroyer Flotilla, 1920–1922
Rear Admiral Edward Dyke Acland MVO CB (1878–1968), Naval Attaché to King George V
Rear Admiral James Ashton DSO (1883–1951), Aide-de-camp to King Edward VIII
Vice Admiral Sir Richard Lane-Poole KBE CB (1883–1971), Commander Australian Fleet, 1936–1938
Rear Admiral Julian Patterson OBE (1884–1972), commanded HMS Hood
Vice Admiral Sir Cecil Ponsonby Talbot KCB KBE DSO & Bar (1884–1970), Aide-de-camp to King George V and Director of Dockyards at the Admiralty, 1937–1946
Major General Robert Glunicke DL (1886–1963), Aide-de-camp to King George VI, 1939–1940, and Commandant, Plymouth Division, Royal Marines, 1939–1941
Admiral Sir Robert Burnett GBE KCB CStJ DSO (1887–1959), Commander-in-Chief, South Atlantic, 1944–1946, and Commander-in-Chief, Plymouth, 1946–1950
Rear Admiral Hector Mackenzie Woodhouse CB OBE (1889–1971)
Admiral Sir Geoffrey Audley Miles KCB KCSI (1890–1986), Head of British Military Mission, Moscow, 1941–1943, Commander-in-Chief, Levant, 1943, Naval Force Commander, Eastern Expeditionary Force, 1943, Deputy Naval Commander, South East Asia Command, 1943–1944, Flag officer, Western Mediterranean, 1944–1945, Senior British Representative on the Tripartite Naval Commission, 1945–1946, and last Commander-in-Chief, Indian Navy of the unified Royal Indian Navy, 1946–1947
Rear Admiral Laurence Boutwood CB OBE KStJ (1898–1982), Fleet Supply Officer, British Pacific Fleet, 1945–1946, assistant director of Plans at the Admiralty, 1946–1948, Fleet Supply Officer, Mediterranean Station, 1950–1953, and Command Supply Officer, Portsmouth, 1953–1956
Vice Admiral Sir Charles Hughes-Hallet KCB CBE (1898–1985), Chief of Staff, Home Fleet, 1950–1951, Head of British Naval Mission, Washington, 1952–1954
Vice Admiral John Hughes-Hallett CB DSO (1901–1972), Naval Commander during the Dieppe Raid, 1942, Commodore commanding Channel Assault Force and Naval Chief of Staff, 1942–1943, Head of Naval Branch, Supreme Allied Command, 1943, Vice-Controller of the Navy, 1950–1952, Flag Officer, Heavy Squadron, Home Fleet, 1952–1953, Conservative MP for Croydon, 1954–1964, credited with proposing the idea of the Mulberry harbour
Rear Admiral Keith McNeil Campbell-Walter CB (1904–1976), Aide-de-camp to Queen Elizabeth II, Flag Officer, Germany, and Commander of Allied Naval Forces Northern Area, Central Europe, 1955–1958
Vice Admiral Sir Raymond Hawkins KCB (1909–1987), Fourth Sea Lord and Vice Controller of the Navy, 1963–1964, Chief of Fleet Support, 1964–1967
Rear Admiral Kenneth Farnhill CB OBE (1913–1983), Director of the Management of Intelligence, Ministry of Defence, 1966–1969
Admiral of the Fleet Sir Michael Le Fanu GCB DSC (1913–1970), Director-General, Naval Weapons, 1958–1960, Controller of the Navy, 1961–1965, Commander-in-Chief, Middle East, 1965–1968, and First Sea Lord, 1968–1970
Rear Admiral James Dunbar Cook CB DL (1921–2007), Assistant Chief of the Naval Staff, 1973–1975
Rear Admiral Robin Trower Hogg CB FRSA (born 1932), Flag Officer, First Flotilla, 1984–1986, and Chief of Staff to the Commander-in-Chief Fleet, 1986–1987

Army

Major General William Carmichael Russell (1824–1905), served during the First Anglo-Sikh War, 1845–1846, and during the Indian Mutiny, 1857
General Sir Henry Augustus Smyth KCMG FSA FRGS (1825–1906), served during the Crimean War and was present at the Siege of Sevastopol, 1854–1855, General Officer Commanding, South Africa, 1886–1889, Governor-General of Cape Colony, 1889, High Commissioner for Southern Africa, 1889, and Governor of Malta, 1890–1893
Major General Francis Glanville (1827–1910)
Major General Willoughby Clarke (1833–1909), served during the Santhal rebellion, 1855–1856, and during the Second Opium War, 1856–1860
Lieutenant General John Le Mesurier (1834–1903), served during the Anglo-Persian War, 1856–1857
Major General George Elphinstone Erskine (1841–1912), served during the Indian Mutiny, 1857
Major General George More-Molyneux CB DSO (1851–1903), served during the Second Anglo-Afghan War, 1878–1880, the Suakin Expedition, 1884–1885, the Third Anglo-Burmese War, 1885–1889, and during the Tirah Campaign, 1897–1898
Major General William Cross Barratt CB CSI DSO (1862–1940), General Officer Commanding, 9th (Secunderabad) Division and General Officer Commanding, 16th Indian Division
General Sir Walter Braithwaite GCB (1865–1945), General Officer Commanding-in-Chief Western Command, India, 1920–1923, General Officer Commanding-in-Chief Scottish Command, 1923–1926, General Officer Commanding-in-Chief Eastern Command, 1926–1927, Adjutant-General to the Forces, 1927–1931
Major General John Hill CB DSO (1866–1935), General Officer Commanding, 52nd (Lowland) Infantry Division, 1916–1918
Major General Louis Lipsett CB CMG (1874–1918), General Officer Commanding, 3rd Canadian Division, 1916–1918, General Officer Commanding, 4th Infantry Division, 1918
Field Marshal Sir Cyril Deverell GCB KBE ADC DL (1874–1947), General Officer Commanding-in-Chief Western Command, 1931–1933, General Officer Commanding-in-Chief Eastern Command, 1933–1936, Chief of the Imperial General Staff, 1936–1937
Major General Sir Digby Shuttleworth KCIE CB CBE DSO (1876–1948), President of the Allied Commission of Control, Turkey, 1920–1923
Major General Sir Horace de Courcy Martelli KBE CB DSO (1877–1959), General Officer Commanding, 42nd (East Lancashire) Division, 1925–1930, Commandant, Shanghai Defence Force, 1927–1928, Major General, Southern Command, 1930–1934, Lieutenant Governor of Jersey, 1934–1939
Lieutenant General Sir William Montgomery Thomson KCMG CB MC (1877–1963), military governor of Baku, 1918
Major General Sir William Twiss KCIE CB CBE MC FRGS (1879–1962), General Officer Commanding, Army in Burma, 1937–1939
Major General Sir Hubert Huddleston GCMG GBE CB DSO MC (1880–1950), Commandant, Sudan Defence Force and General Officer Commanding, Sudan, 1925–1930, and Governor-General of the Sudan, 1940–1947
Major General Hugh MacMahon CB CSI CBE MC (1880–1939), Aide-de-camp to King George V, and Quartermaster General, Northern Command, 1933–1937
Major General Sir Claude Liardet KBE CB DSO TD DL (1881–1966), General Officer Commanding, 56th (London) Division, 1938–1941, and first Commandant-General of the RAF Regiment, 1942–1945
Major General Maxwell Brander CB OBE (1884–1972), War Office, 1937–1940, Ministry of Supply, 1941–1947
Major General Lancelot Hickes CB OBE MC (1884–1965), War Office, 1939–1941
Major General Sir Guy Riley KBE CB (1884–1964), War Office, 1937–1943
Major General Algernon Fuller CBE (1885–1970), War Office, 1938–1940, Ministry of Supply, 1940–1941, and inventor of the Fullerphone
Lieutenant General Sir William Baker KCIE CB DSO OBE (1888–1964), Adjutant-General of India, 1941–1944
Major General Austin Timeous Miller CB MC & Bar (1888–1947), Scottish Command, 1941–1945
Major General Sir Noel Holmes KBE CB MC (1891–1982), War Office, 1939–1946
Major General Christopher Maltby CB MC DL (1891–1980), Commander British Troops in China, 1941
General Sir Henry Colville Wemyss KCB KBE DSO MC (1891–1959), Adjutant-General to the Forces, 1940–1941, Head of British Army Mission, Washington, 1941–1942, Military Secretary to the Secretary of State for War, 1942–1945
Major General Sir Leslie Gordon Phillips KBE CB MC (1892–1966), Director of Signals, War Office, 1943–1946
Major General Sir Eustace Tickell KBE CB MC (1893–1972), Engineer-in-Chief, War Office, 1944–1948
Lieutenant General Sir Harold Rawdon Briggs KCIE KBE CB CBE DSO (1894–1952), Commander-in-Chief, Burma Command, 1946–1948
Major General Alfred Curtis CB DSO MC (1894–1971), General Officer Commanding, 14th Indian Infantry Division, and Aide-de-camp to King George VI
Major General Raymond Briggs CB DSO (1895–1984), General Officer Commanding, 1st Armoured Division, 1942–1943
General Sir Sidney Kirkman GCB KBE MC (1895–1982), General Officer Commanding, 50th (Northumbrian) Division, 1942–1944, General Officer Commanding, XIII Corps, 1944–1945, Deputy Chief of the Imperial General Staff, 1945–1947, and Quartermaster-General to the Forces, 1947–1950
Major General Bernard Cooke Dixon CB CBE MC (1896–1973), Engineer-in-Charge, General Headquarters, Middle East, 1944–1947, and Chief Engineer, Headquarters, Western Command, 1947–1948
Major General Sir Reginald Kerr KBE CB MC (1897–1974), Director of Supplies and Transport, War Office, 1943–1946
Major General Francis St David Benwell Lejeune CB CBE (1899–1984), Commander, Anti-Aircraft Group, 1944–1946, War Office, 1946–1949
General Sir Frank Simpson GBE KCB DSO (1899–1986), Chief of Staff to Field Marshal Bernard Montgomery, 1940–1942, deputy director of Military Operations at the War Office, 1942–1943, Director of Military Operations at the War Office, 1943–1945, Assistant Chief of the Imperial General Staff, 1945–1946, Vice Chief of the Imperial General Staff, 1946–1948, General Officer Commanding-in-Chief Western Command, 1948–1952, Commandant, Imperial Defence College, 1952–1954
Major General Robert Cottrell-Hill CB CBE DSO & Bar MC (1903–1965), Commandant, British Sector, Berlin, 1955–1956
Lieutenant colonel Arthur Cocks (1904–1944), first British Army officer to be killed on D-Day
Major General Sir Nigel Tapp KBE CB DSO (1904–1991), General Officer Commanding, East Africa Command, 1957–1960
Major General Gerald Kellett CB CBE (1905–1973), Director General of Artillery, War Office, 1957–1960
Lieutenant General Sir William Pike KCB CBE DSO (1905–1993), Vice Chief of the Imperial General Staff, 1960–1963
Major General Kenneth Bastyan CB CBE (1906–1975), Chief Signal Officer, British Army of the Rhine and Northern Army Group, 1957–1960
Major General Henry Maughan Liardet CB CBE DSO DL (1906–1996), Chief of Staff, British Joint Services Mission, Washington, 1956–1958
Major General Ronald Urquhart CB DSO (1906–1968), Director of Combined Operations, 1947–1949, Chief of Staff, Western Command, 1956, and Commandant, Royal Military Academy Sandhurst, 1957–1960
Major General Michael Whitworth Prynne CB CBE (1912–1977), deputy director, War Office, 1960–1964, and Chief of Staff, Headquarters, Southern Command, 1964–1967
Major-General Edward Maitland-Makgill-Crichton OBE (1916–2009), General Officer Commanding, 51st (Highland) Division, 1966–1968
Lieutenant General Sir John Read KCB OBE (1917–1987), Director of Military Operations, Ministry of Defence, 1968–1970, Assistant Chief of the Defence Staff, Ministry of Defence, 1970–1971, and Director of International Military Staff, NATO Headquarters, Brussels, 1971–1975
Major General Colin Shortis CB CBE (born 1934), Director of Infantry, British Army, 1983–1986, and General Officer Commanding, North West District, 1986–1989
Major General Timothy Toyne Sewell DL (born 1941), Commandant, Royal Military Academy Sandhurst, 1991–1994
Captain Aubrey Beaty MC (1916-2009) First British soldier to enter Germany after D-Day.
Lieutenant-Colonel Lewis Balfour Oatts DSO (1902-1992)

Air Force
Air Vice-Marshal Sir Sefton Brancker KCB AFC (1877–1930), Director-General of Civil Aviation, 1922–1930, and victim of the R101 disaster
Air Chief Marshal Sir Charles Burnett KCB CBE DSO (1882–1945), Deputy Chief of the Air Staff, 1931–1932, Air Officer Commanding British Forces, Iraq, 1932–1935, Air Officer Commanding-in-Chief, RAF Training Command, 1936–1939, and Chief of the Air Staff, Royal Australian Air Force, 1939–1942
Marshal of the RAF Cyril Newall, 1st Baron Newall GCB OM GCMG CBE AM (1886–1963), Deputy Chief of the Air Staff, 1926–1931, Air Officer Commanding, Middle East Command, 1931–1934, Air Member for Supply and Organisation, 1935–1937, Chief of the Air Staff, 1937–1940, and Governor-General of New Zealand, 1940–1946
Air Vice-Marshal Sir Paul Maltby KCVO KBE CB DSO AFC DL (1892–1971), Air Officer Commanding, Java, 1942, and Black Rod, 1946–1962
Major Charles Dawson Booker DSC (1897–1918), First World War flying ace
Air Vice-Marshal Hugh Hamilton Brookes CB CBE DFC (1904–1988), Air Officer Commanding, Rhodesia, 1951–1954, Air Officer Commanding, Iraq, 1954–1956, and Air Officer Commanding, No 25 Group, RAF Flying Training Command, 1956–1958
Air Vice-Marshal Douglas Ryley CB CBE (1905–1985), Air Officer Commanding and Commandant, RAF Henlow, 1949–1952, Director of Armament Engineering, Air Ministry, 1954–1957, and Director of Guided Weapons Engineering, Air Ministry, 1957–1958
Air Vice-Marshal Brian Courtenay Yarde CVO CBE (1905–1986), Commandant-General of the RAF Regiment, 1954–1957
Marshal of the RAF Sir Thomas Pike GCB CBE DFC & Bar DL (1906–1983), Deputy Chief of the Air Staff, 1953–1956, Air Officer Commanding-in-Chief, RAF Fighter Command, 1956–1959, Chief of the Air Staff, 1960–1964, and Deputy Supreme Allied Commander Europe, 1964–1967
Air Vice-Marshal Clayton Boyce CB CBE (1907–1987), Secretary General of Allied Air Forces, Central Europe, 1953–1954, Air Officer Commanding, Cyprus and the Levant, 1954–1956
Air Vice-Marshal Hubert Chapman CB CBE (1910–1972), Air Officer Commanding, No. 43 Group, 1950–1951
Air Chief Marshal Sir David Lee GBE CB (1912–2004), the United Kingdom's Military Representative to NATO, 1968–1971
Group Captain Brian Kingcome DSO DFC & Bar (1917–1994), Second World War flying ace
Air Vice-Marshal Michael Adams CB AFC FRAeS (born 1934), Assistant Chief of the Air Staff for Operational Requirements, Ministry of Defence, 1984–1986, Senior Directing Officer, Royal College of Defence Studies, 1987–1988

Aviation

Commander Sir Walter Windham (1868–1942), pioneering aviator who established the world's first airmail services
Claude Grahame-White (1879–1959), pioneering aviator who made the world's first night-time takeoff
John Dudley North CBE (1893–1968), aircraft designer and chairman of Boulton Paul Aircraft
Group Captain George Bulman CBE MC AFC & Bar FRAeS (1896–1963), chief test pilot and director at Hawker Aircraft
Bob Feilden CBE FRS FREng FIMechE (1917–2004), mechanical engineer, an essential part of the Power Jets team that developed the first jet engine with Sir Frank Whittle, 1940–1946, author of the seminal Report of the Feilden Committee on Engineering Design, 1963, and Director General of the British Standards Institution, 1970–1981

The church

Revd Canon John Hensman (1780–1864), Fellow of Corpus Christi College, Cambridge, and prolific church builder
Revd Fr William Lockhart (1820–1892), first of the Oxford Movement to convert from Anglicanism to Catholicism
Revd Canon Dr George Maclear (1833–1902), theological writer
Ven William Percival Johnson (1854–1928), missionary in Africa
Rt Revd Walter Ruthven Pym (1856–1908), Bishop of Mauritius, 1898–1903, Bishop of Bombay, 1903–1908, and grandfather of Francis Pym, Foreign Secretary under Margaret Thatcher
Rt Revd Ernest Augustus Anderson (1859–1945), Bishop of Riverina, 1895–1925
Rt Revd Dr Hubert Murray Burge (1862–1925), Headmaster of Winchester College, 1901–1910, Bishop of Southwark, 1910–1919, and Bishop of Oxford, 1919–1925
Rt Revd William Surtees (1871–1956), Bishop of Crediton, 1930–1954
Most Revd Dr John Gregg CH (1873–1961), Bishop of Ossory, Ferns and Leighlin, 1915–1920, Archbishop of Dublin and Primate of Ireland, 1920–1939, Archbishop of Armagh and Primate of All Ireland, 1939–1959
Rt Revd Walter Carey (1875–1955), Bishop of Bloemfontein, 1921–1935, theological writer, and British Isles XV rugby international
Rt Revd John Weller (1880–1969), Bishop of the Falkland Islands, 1934–1945
Rt Revd Richard Dyke Acland (1881–1954), Bishop of Bombay, 1929–1947
Rt Revd Dr Bertram Lasbrey (1881–1976), Bishop on the Niger, 1922–1945
Rt Revd Dr Wilfred Askwith KCMG (1890–1962), Bishop of Blackburn, 1942–1954, and Bishop of Gloucester, 1954–1962
Rt Revd Noel Hall (1891–1962), Bishop of Chota Nagpur, 1936–1957
Rt Revd David Farmbrough (1929–2013), Bishop of Bedford, 1981–1993
Rt Revd Robin Smith (born 1936), Bishop of Hertford, 1990–2001
Canon David Watson (priest, evangelist, author) (1933-1984), Vicar of St Cuthbert's Church, York/St. Michael-le-Belfry, York, 1965-1982

The Civil and Diplomatic Services
Vivian Gordon Bowden CBE (1884–1942), Australian businessman, public servant and diplomat, Australian Official Representative in Singapore (1941–1942).
Sir Walter Hillier KCMG CB (1849–1927), diplomat, author, Sinologist and Professor of Chinese, King's College London
Sir Aubrey Vere Symonds KCB (1874–1931), Permanent Secretary, Board of Education, 1925–1931
Sir Edward Crowe KCMG (1877–1960), Comptroller-General, Department for Overseas Trade, 1928–1937
Gilbert Campion, 1st Baron Campion GCB (1882–1958), Clerk of the House of Commons, 1937–1948
Sir Harold MacMichael GCMG DSO (1882–1969), Governor of Tanganyika, 1934–1938, High Commissioner to Palestine, 1938–1944
Sir John FitzGerald Moylan CB CBE (1882–1967), Under-Secretary of State at the Home Office, 1940–1945
Sir Bernard Rawdon Reilly KCMG CIE OBE (1882–1966), British Resident in Aden, 1931–1932, Chief Commissioner of Aden, 1932–1937, Governor of Aden, 1937–1940
Sir William Castle Cleary KBE CB (1886–1971), Principal Private Secretary to the President of the Board of Education, 1931–1935, Principal Assistant Secretary for Elementary Education, 1940–1945, and Deputy Secretary, Ministry of Education, 1945–1950
Bertram Lamb Pearson CB DSO MC (1893–1984), Principal Private Secretary to the President of the Board of Education, 1937–1946, and Under Secretary, Ministry of Education, 1946–1955
Sir Charles Belgrave KBE (1894–1969), Chief Administrator to the rulers of Bahrain, 1926–1957
Herbert Gybbon-Monypenny CBE (1895–1988), Ambassador to the Dominican Republic, 1953–1955
Sir Percivale Liesching KCMG KCB GCMG KCVO (1895–1973), Permanent Under-Secretary, Ministry of Food, 1946–1948, Permanent Under-Secretary of State for Commonwealth Relations, 1949–1955, and High Commissioner to South Africa, 1955–1958
Sir Pierson Dixon GCMG CB (1904–1965), Principal Private Secretary to the Foreign Secretary, 1943–1948, Ambassador to Czechoslovakia, 1948–1950, Deputy Under-Secretary of State at the Foreign Office, 1950–1954, Permanent Representative of the United Kingdom to the United Nations, 1954–1960, and Ambassador to France, 1960–1965
Sir George Godber GCB (1908–2009), Chief Medical Officer, 1960–1973
Sir George Lisle Clutton KCMG FSA (1909–1970), Ambassador to the Philippines, 1955–1959, and Ambassador to Poland, 1960–1966
Ian Clayton Mackenzie CBE (1909–2009), Ambassador to South Korea, 1967–1969
Sir Bruce Fraser KCB (1910–1993), Permanent Secretary, Ministry of Health, 1960–1964, Joint Permanent Under-Secretary of State, Department of Education and Science, 1964–1965, Permanent Secretary, Ministry of Land and Natural Resources, 1965–1966, Comptroller and Auditor General, Exchequer, 1966–1971
Thomas Rogers MBE CMG (1912–1999), Ambassador to Colombia, 1970–1973
John Glendwr Owen CB (1914–1977), Under Secretary at HM Treasury, 1959–1973
John Gordon Doubleday OBE (1920–1982), Ambassador to Liberia, 1978–1980
Peter Tripp CMG (1921–2010), Ambassador to Libya, 1970–1974, High Commissioner to Singapore, 1974–1978, and Ambassador to Thailand, 1978–1981
Sir James Hennessy KBE CMG (born 1923), Ambassador to Uruguay, 1971–1972, High Commissioner to Uganda, 1973–1976, Ambassador to Rwanda, 1973–1976, Governor of Belize, 1980–1981, and Her Majesty's Chief Inspector of Prisons, 1982–1987
Peter Maxey CMG (born 1930), Under Secretary at the Cabinet Office, 1978–1981, Ambassador to the German Democratic Republic, 1981–1984, and Ambassador to the United Nations, 1984–1986
Sir Alan Bailey KCB (born 1931), Principal Private Secretary to the Chancellor of the Exchequer, 1971–1973, Under Secretary at HM Treasury, 1973–1978, Deputy Secretary at HM Treasury, 1978–1983, Permanent Secretary at HM Treasury, 1983–1985, and Permanent Secretary at the Department for Transport, 1986–1991
William Myles Knighton CB (born 1931), Principal Private Secretary to the Minister of Technology, 1966–1968, Assistant Secretary, Department of Trade, 1967–1974, Under Secretary, Department of Trade, 1974–1978, Deputy Secretary, Department of Trade, 1978–1983, Deputy Secretary, Department for Transport, 1983–1986, and Principal Establishment and Finance Officer, Department of Trade and Industry, 1986–1991
Sir Michael Burton KCVO CMG (born 1937), British Minister in Berlin, 1985–1992, Assistant Under-Secretary of State at the Foreign Office, 1993, and Ambassador to the Czech Republic, 1994–1997
Sir Allan Ramsay KBE CMG (born 1937), Ambassador to the Lebanon, 1988–1990, Ambassador to the Sudan, 1990–1991, and Ambassador to Morocco, 1992–1996
John Martin CMG (1943–1999), High Commissioner to Malawi, 1993–1998
Paul Wright (born 1946), Under Secretary, Department for Culture, Media and Sport, 1992–1999
Richard Northern MBE (born 1954), Ambassador to Libya, 2010–2011
John Hawkins (born 1960), Ambassador to Qatar, 2008–2012

Industry and commerce

Sir William Harpur (c1496–1574), Sheriff of the City of London, 1556–1557, Lord Mayor of London, 1561–1562
Julius Drewe (1856–1931), creator of Home and Colonial Stores, and builder of Castle Drogo, Devon
Sir Reginald Butler, 1st Baronet (1866–1933), chairman of United Dairies
Sir Harold Yarrow, 2nd Baronet GBE (1884–1962), chairman and managing director of Yarrow Shipbuilders and chairman of Clydesdale Bank
Sir John Howard DL (1901–1986), civil engineer responsible for construction of the Severn Bridge, the Humber Bridge, the Forth Road Bridge and the Channel Tunnel
Sir Peter Parker KBE LVO (1924–2002), chairman of British Rail, 1976–1983
Sir Peter Hunt FRICS (1933–1997), chairman and managing director of Land Securities, 1978–1997
Derek Bonham (1943–2007), CEO of Hanson Group, 1992–1997, chairman of Imperial Tobacco, 1996–2007, chairman of Cadbury Schweppes, 2000–2003, and chairman of Marconi, 2001–2002
Miles Young (born 1954), chairman and CEO of Ogilvy & Mather, 2009–
Andrew Horton (born 1962), CEO of Beazley Group, 2008–

Journalism

William White (1807–1882), parliamentary sketch writer
Henry Corbet (1820–1878), agricultural writer and editor
E H D Sewell (1872–1947), author, cricket and rugby journalist, Essex and MCC cricketer
Hugo Tyerman (1880–1977), author and journalist
Major Peter Lawless MC (1891–1945), war correspondent for The Daily Telegraph, killed during the Battle of Remagen
Henry Longhurst (1909–1978), BBC sports commentator and golf writer, Golfing Correspondent of The Sunday Times, Conservative MP for Acton, 1943–1945
Peter Stursberg CM (1913–2014), Canadian writer, broadcaster and war correspondent
Pearce Wright (1933–2005), Science Editor of The Times, 1974–1990
Michael De-la-Noy (1934–2002), author, journalist and gay rights advocate
Richard Lindley (born 1936), BBC and ITN journalist
John Percival (1937–2005), BBC and Channel 4 documentary film maker
Michael Brunson OBE (born 1940), ITN Political Editor, Diplomatic Editor and Washington Correspondent
Robert Hewison (born 1943), Theatre Critic of The Sunday Times
John Witherow (born 1952), Editor of The Sunday Times, 1995–2013, Editor of The Times, 2013–
David Foster (born 1954) US Correspondent TV-am 1987–1992, Sky News, principal anchor Aljazeera English 2005- 2016, TRT World current affairs 2016-
Matthew Chilton (born 1963), BBC sports commentator
Will Gompertz (born 1965), BBC Arts Editor
Ned Boulting (born 1969), author, sports journalist and commentator

Law

Sir John Leach KC (1760–1834), Judge, Privy Councillor, Whig and Tory MP for Seaford, 1806–1816, Chancellor of the Duchy of Cornwall, 1816–1818, Vice Chancellor of England, 1818–1827, and Master of the Rolls, 1827–1834
Erskine May, 1st Baron Farnborough KCB (1815–1886), constitutional theorist, Privy Councillor, Clerk of the House of Commons, 1871–1886, and the original author of Erskine May: Parliamentary Practice
Henry Hawkins, 1st Baron Brampton QC (1817–1907), High Court Judge, 1876–1898, and Privy Councillor
Sir Henry Verey (1836–1920), Official Referee of the Supreme Court of Judicature, 1876–1920
Sir Frank Beaman (1858–1928), High Court Judge, Bombay, 1906–1918
Sir Reginald Ward Poole KCVO (1864–1941), President of the Law Society, 1933–1934
Sir Henry Gompertz (1867–1930), Supreme Court Judge, Hong Kong, 1909–1925, and Chief Justice of the Federated Malay States, 1925–1929
Sir Babington Bennett Newbould (1867–1937), High Court Judge, Calcutta, 1916–1927
Sir George Arthur Harwin Branson (1871–1951), High Court Judge, 1921–1939, Privy Councillor, and grandfather of Sir Richard Branson
Sir Cecil Fforde KC (1875–1951), High Court Judge, Lahore, 1922–1931
Mr Justice Saul Solomon KC (1875–1960), Supreme Court Judge, South Africa, 1927–1945
Sir Lynden Macassey KBE KC (1876–1963), labour lawyer
Mr Justice Harold Blacker (1889–1944), High Court Judge, Lahore, 1937–1944
Sir Gerald Osborne Slade KC (1891–1962), High Court Judge, 1948–1962
Sir Audley McKisack QC (1903–1966), Attorney General of Nigeria, 1951–1956, Chief Justice of Uganda, 1956–1962, President of the High Court of the Federation of South Arabia, 1964–1966, and Appeal Court Judge of the Bahamas and Bermuda, 1965–1966
Sir Phillip Bridges CMG QC (1922–2007), Solicitor General of The Gambia, 1963–1964, Attorney General of The Gambia, 1964–1968, and Chief Justice of The Gambia, 1968–1983
Sir Stephen Mitchell QC (born 1941), High Court Judge, 1993–2003

Literature

John Pomfret (1667–1702), poet
Samuel Palmer (1741–1813), biographer
Foster Barham Zincke (1817–1893), antiquary
Morley Roberts (1857–1942), novelist and short story writer
Frederick Carruthers Cornell OBE (1867–1921), South African short story writer and poet
Saki (1870–1916), short story writer
Hesketh Pearson (1887–1964), biographer
Noel Carrington (1895–1989), originator of Puffin Books, and brother of the artist Dora Carrington
John Armitage (1910–1980), Editor of Encyclopædia Britannica, 1949–1967
C E T Warren MBE (1912–1988), author of Above Us The Waves
John Fowles (1926–2005), novelist, author of The Magus and The French Lieutenant's Woman
Jonathon Green (born 1948), lexicographer
Shoo Rayner (born 1956), author and illustrator of children's books

Medicine 
Professor Robert Elliot FRCS (1864–1936), surgeon and author
George Drummond Robinson FRCP (1864–1950), obstetrician
Sir Maurice Craig CBE FRCP (1866–1935), psychiatrist to Virginia Woolf and to the future King Edward VIII, and pioneer in the treatment of mental illness
Major General Francis Hutchinson CIE (1870–1931), Surgeon to the King
Frank Eve FRCP (1871–1952) physician who gave his name to the "Eve Method" of artificial respiration
William Branson CBE FRCP (1874–1950), physician, author, and great uncle of Sir Richard Branson
Professor James Radclyffe McDonagh FRCS (1881–1965), surgeon and author
Sir Adolphe Abrahams OBE FRCP (1883–1967), physician and founder of British sports science
Felix Warden Brown FRCP FRCPsych (1908–1972), psychiatrist
Professor Charles Enrique Dent CBE FRCP FRS (1911–1976), physician and biochemist who gave his name to Dent's Disease
George Crichton Wells FRCP (1914–1999), dermatologist who gave his name to Wells' Syndrome
Frank Cockett FRCS (1916–2014), surgeon, author and art historian
Professor John MacFarlane Cliff FRCP (1921–1972), Professor of Naval Medicine, Royal Hospital Haslar
Major General Michael Brown FRCPE FRCP (1931–1993), Director of Army Medicine and Physician to the Queen
Professor Rory Shaw FRCP (born 1954), Professor of Respiratory Medicine, Imperial College School of Medicine, 1997–

Music

C H Bovill (1878–1918), lyricist, songwriter, author, and collaborator with P G Wodehouse
Dr Marmaduke Conway FRCO (1885–1961), organist and writer
Darrell Fancourt (1886–1953), bass-baritone singer who starred in more than 10,000 performances with the D'Oyly Carte Opera Company
Dr Herbert Kennedy Andrews FRCO (1904–1965), Fellow in Music, New College, Oxford, composer, musicologist and organist
Richard Kerr (born 1944), songwriter
Frank Musker (born 1951), composer and songwriter
Alec Dankworth (born 1960), jazz bassist
Marius de Vries (born 1961), composer and record producer
Andrew Manze (born 1965), associate director of the Academy of Ancient Music, 1996–2003, artistic director of The English Concert, 2003–2007, Principal Conductor and artistic director of the Helsingborg Symphony Orchestra, 2006–
Philip Stopford (born 1977), choir director and composer of sacred choral music
Grzegorz Turnau (born 1967), composer, pianist, poet and singer 
Xander Rawlins (born 1984), singer-songwriter and documentary film maker

Politicians and statesmen

John Williams (c1519-c1561), MP for Bedford, 1554–1555
Thomas Barnard DL (1830–1909), Whig MP for Bedford, 1857–1859
Lieutenant Commander Norman Carlyle Craig KC (1868–1919), Conservative MP for the Isle of Thanet, 1910–1919
Sir Walter Preston (1875–1946), Conservative MP for Mile End, 1918–1923, Conservative MP for Cheltenham, 1928–1937
Auberon Herbert, 9th Baron Lucas (1876–1916), Liberal politician and fighter pilot, Privy Councillor, Under-Secretary of State for War, 1908–1911, Under-Secretary of State for the Colonies, 1911, Parliamentary Secretary to the Board of Agriculture and Fisheries, 1911–1914, President of the Board of Agriculture, 1914–1915
Sir Richard Wells, 1st Baronet DL (1879–1957), Conservative MP for Bedford, 1922–1945
Colonel Eric Harrison (1880–1948), Australian MP, 1931–1937
Air Commodore Sir Frank Nelson KCMG (1883–1966), Conservative MP for Stroud, 1924–1931, and the first head of Special Operations Executive, 1940–1942
Leslie Ruthven Pym (1884–1945), Conservative MP for Monmouth, 1939–1945, and father of Francis Pym, Foreign Secretary under Margaret Thatcher
Charles Theodore Te Water (1887–1964), President of the Assembly of the League of Nations, 1933–1934
Sir Walter Jackson Cooper MBE (1888–1973), Australian Senator, 1928–1968, Minister of Repatriation, 1949–1960
Sir Trounsell Gilbert CBE KC (1888–1975), Chief Justice and President of the Senate of Bermuda, 1952–1958
Alan Grahame Brown (1913–1972), Labour and Conservative MP for Tottenham, 1959–1964
Sir Anthony Fell (1914–1998), Conservative MP for Great Yarmouth, 1951–1983
Joseph Godber, Baron Godber of Willington (1914–1980), Privy Councillor, Conservative MP for Grantham, 1951–1979, Parliamentary Secretary to the Ministry of Agriculture, Fisheries and Food, 1957–1960, Under-Secretary of State for Foreign Affairs, 1960–1961, Minister of State for Foreign Affairs, 1961–1963, Secretary of State for War, 1963, Minister of Labour, 1963–1964, Minister of State for Foreign Affairs, 1970–1972, and Minister of Agriculture, Fisheries and Food, 1972–1974
Major Richard Harden DSO MC (1916–2000), Ulster Unionist MP for Armagh, 1948–1954
Major Geraint Morgan QC (1920–1995), Conservative MP for Denbigh, 1959–1983, and champion of the Welsh language
Stephen Ross, Baron Ross of Newport (1926–1993), Liberal MP for the Isle of Wight, 1974–1987
Michael Morris, Baron Naseby (born 1936), Privy Councillor, Conservative MP for Northampton South, 1974–1997
Krishnan Srinivasan (born 1937), Indian Foreign Secretary, 1994–1995, Deputy Secretary-General of the Commonwealth of Nations, 1995–2002
Paddy Ashdown, Baron Ashdown of Norton-sub-Hamdon GCMG KBE (1941–2018), Privy Councillor, Liberal Democrat MP for Yeovil, 1983–2001, leader of the Liberal Democrats, 1988–1999, international High Representative for Bosnia and Herzegovina, 2002–2006
Sir Gerry Neale (born 1941), Conservative MP for North Cornwall, 1979–1992
John Carlisle (1942–2019), Conservative MP for Luton, 1979–1997
John Taylor, Baron Taylor of Holbeach CBE FRSA (born 1943), Conservative politician, Minister at the Home Office, 2012–2014, and Government Chief Whip in the House of Lords, 2014–
Bob Clay (born 1946), Labour MP for Sunderland North, 1983–1992
Malcolm Harbour CBE (born 1947), Conservative MEP for the West Midlands, 1999–2014
Desmond Swayne (born 1956), Conservative MP for New Forest West, 1997–, Parliamentary Private Secretary to David Cameron, 2010–2012, and Minister of State for International Development, 2014–
Brooks Newmark (born 1958), Conservative MP for Braintree, Essex, 2005–2015, and Minister for Civil Society, 2014
Neil Coyle (born 1978), Labour Party Member of Parliament (MP) for Bermondsey and Old Southwark

Sport

All-Rounders

Percy Christopherson (1866–1921), England rugby international and Kent cricketer
Freddie Brooks OBE (1883–1947), England rugby international and Rhodesia cricketer
Frank Brooks (1884–1952), Rhodesia cricketer, rugby international and tennis player
Lieutenant Colonel Stan Harris CBE (1894–1973), England and British Lions rugby international, water polo international, South Africa Davis Cup tennis player, South Africa light-heavyweight boxing champion, and Wimbledon mixed doubles winner, who turned down a place in the 1920 Great Britain Olympic team
Gilbert Cook CVO CBE (1911–1979), England rugby international and Ireland cricketer

Athletics

Harold Abrahams CBE (1899–1978), Olympic sprinter and long jumper, winner of the gold medal in 1924 for the 100-metre sprint; a feat portrayed in the film Chariots of Fire
Brigadier Dick Webster (1914–2009), Olympic pole vaulter, 1936 and 1948

Cricket

William Weighell (1846–1905), Sussex cricketer
William Woof (1858–1937), Gloucestershire and MCC cricketer
Herbert Orr (1865–1940), Western Australia cricketer
Ralph Joyce (1878–1908), Leicestershire cricketer
Percy Sherwell (1880-1948), South Africa cricketer 
Harold Baumgartner (1883–1938), South Africa cricketer
Arthur Cantrell (1883–1954), Royal Navy first-class cricketer
Francis Joyce (1886–1958), Leicestershire cricketer
Bertram Peel (1881–1945), Oxford University and Scotland first-class cricketer
Denis Peel (1886–1927), Oxford University first-class cricketer
Arthur Cocks (1904–1944), British Army cricketer
Lancelot Robinson (1905–1935), MCC cricketer
Cyril Reed (1906–1991), Madras cricketer
William Sime CMG MBE QC (1909–1983), Nottinghamshire cricketer, and Judge
Brian Disbury (born 1929), Kent cricketer
Michael Allen (1933–1995), Northamptonshire, MCC and Derbyshire cricketer
Martin Meeson (1933–1995), Cambridge University first-class cricketer
Rex Collinge (born 1935), Combined Services first-class cricketer
Ian Peck (born 1957), Northamptonshire cricketer
Robin Boyd-Moss (born 1959), Northamptonshire cricketer
Toby Bailey (born 1976), Northamptonshire cricketer
Will Smith (born 1982), Hampshire, Durham and Nottinghamshire cricketer
Adrian Shankar (born 1982), Worcestershire cricketer
 Sir Alastair Cook CBE (born 1984), Essex, MCC and England cricketer, and captain of the England cricket team
Alex Wakely (born 1988), Northamptonshire cricketer and captain of the England Under-19 cricket team
James Kettleborough (born 1992), Northamptonshire cricketer

Equestrianism

Brigadier Lyndon Bolton DSO & Bar DL (1899–1995), Olympic horseman, 1948

Fencing

Colonel Ronald Bruce Campbell CBE DSO (1878–1963), Olympic fencer, 1920

Football

Harold Henman (1879–1969), international footballer who played for both South Africa and Argentina

Hockey

Stefan Tewes (born 1967), Olympic gold medalist in hockey, 1992
Sven Meinhardt (born 1971), Olympic gold medalist in hockey, 1992

Motor Sport

Dan Wheldon (1978–2011), racing driver, Indianapolis 500 winner, 2005 and 2011

Rowing

William Crofts (1846–1912), rower
Jack Beresford CBE (1899–1977), Olympic rower, winner of five medals (three gold, two silver) at five Olympic Games in succession, 1920–1936
Harold Morphy (1902–1987), Olympic rower, 1924
Dr Edward Vaughan Bevan (1907–1988), Olympic rower, gold medalist, 1928
William Windham (born 1926), Olympic rower, 1952
James Crowden (born 1927), Olympic rower, 1952
Michael Beresford (born 1934), Olympic rower, 1960
Phelan Hill (born 1979), Olympic rower, bronze and gold medalist, 2012 and 2016

Rugby

Major General Sir Robert Henderson KCMG CB (1858–1924), England rugby international, and Physician to the King
Philip Jacob (1875–p1927), England rugby international
Francis Palmer MC (1877–1951), England rugby international
Curly Hammond (1879–1963), England rugby international
Basil Maclear (1881–1915), Ireland rugby international
Ernest Chambers (1882–1946), England rugby international
Cecil Milton (1884–1961), England rugby international
Jumbo Milton (1885–1915), England rugby international whilst still a pupil at Bedford School
Henry Vassall (1887–1949), England rugby international
Sir Arthur Blakiston, 7th Baronet MC (1892–1974), England and British Lions rugby international
Sir Basil McFarland, 2nd Baronet CBE ERD (1898–1986), Ireland rugby international
Robert Jones (1900–1970), Wales rugby international
Leo Oakley (1926–1981), England rugby international
Budge Rogers OBE (born 1933), England and British Lions rugby international
Martin Bayfield (born 1966), England and British Lions rugby international
Andy Gomarsall MBE (born 1974), England rugby international
David Callam (born 1983), Scotland rugby international
George Furbank (born 1996), England rugby international

Tennis

Patrick Wheatley (1899–1967), tennis player who competed at Wimbledon on eleven separate occasions, 1921–1933, at the Olympic Games, 1924, and in the Davis Cup, 1926

References

Bedford School
Bedford